BBC Radio Scotland is a Scottish radio network owned and operated by BBC Scotland, a division of the BBC. It broadcasts a wide variety of programmes. It replaced the Scottish BBC Radio 4 opt-out service of the same name from 23 November 1978. Radio Scotland is broadcast in English, whilst sister station Radio nan Gàidheal broadcasts in Scottish Gaelic.

According to RAJAR, the station broadcasts to a weekly audience of 780,000 and has a listening share of 6.2% as of December 2022.

History

The first BBC Radio Scotland broadcast was on 17 December 1973, two weeks earlier than planned.

BBC Radio Scotland was founded as a full-time radio network on 23 November 1978. Previously it was possible only to opt out of BBC Radio 4, and the service was known as Radio 4 Scotland or, formally on air, as "BBC Scotland Radio 4".  The establishment of a separate network was made possible when Radio 4 became a fully UK-wide network when it moved from medium wave to long wave and new VHF (FM) transmitters were brought into service so that Radio 4 and Radio Scotland no longer had to share on FM. However it was not until the early 1990s that Radio 4 was available on FM across all of Scotland so for its first decade on air, the station only broadcast during the day so that Radio 4 could be heard on Radio Scotland's transmitters in the evening to compensate for poorer AM reception after dark.

Kirsty Wark launched her career on BBC Radio Scotland, first as a researcher and then as a producer.

Programmes
The station broadcasts a wide range of programming, including news, debate, music, drama, comedy and sports. It is broadcast from the BBC Scotland headquarters in the Pacific Quay in Glasgow.

Local opt-outs
BBC Radio Orkney and BBC Radio Shetland opt out of BBC Radio Scotland for 30 minutes each weekday to broadcast a local news programme and during the winter months this is supplemented for both areas by an additional hour-long programme. Local news and weather bulletins are also broadcast as opt-outs from news studios in Selkirk, Dumfries, Aberdeen and Inverness on weekdays.

Notable presenters

Kaye Adams (news)
John Beattie (sport)
Bryan Burnett (music)
Stuart Cosgrove (sport)
Tam Cowan (sport)
Archie Fisher (music)
Vic Galloway (music)
Jim Gellatly (music)
Richard Gordon (sport)
Gary Innes (music)
Mary Ann Kennedy (lifestyle, features and documentaries)
Fred MacAulay (lifestyle, features and documentaries)
Cathy MacDonald (music)
Bruce MacGregor (music)
Sally Magnusson (lifestyle, features and documentaries)
Tom Morton (music)
Shereen Nanjiani (news)
Natasha Raskin Sharp (music)
Ricky Ross (music)
Graham Stewart (news)
Grant Stott (music)
Gary West (music)

Past presenters

Dougie Anderson
Colin Bell
Ken Bruce
Jackie Brambles
Andy Cameron
Armando Iannucci
Jimmie Macgregor
Anne MacKenzie
Jimmy Mack
Eddie Mair
Sheena McDonald
Brian Morton
Charles Nove
Iain Purdon
Robbie Shepherd (music)
Ken Sykora
Jim Traynor
Kirsty Young

Heads of Radio, Scotland

The title "Head of Radio, Scotland" was applied to cover not only the Radio Scotland service but also BBC Scotland's radio productions for other networks.

References

Further reading
 Lockerbie, Catherine (1985), "Making Waves: Radio in Scotland", in Parker, Geoff (ed.), Cencrastus No. 20, Spring 1985, pp. 8 - 11,

External links

Scotland
Radio stations established in 1978
Radio stations in Glasgow
BBC Scotland
1978 establishments in Scotland
Radio stations in Scotland